This is a List of Assam List A cricket records, with each list containing the top five performances in the category.

Currently active players are bolded.

Team records

Highest innings totals

Lowest innings totals

Largest Margin of Runs Victory

Batting records

Highest individual scores

Bowling records

Best innings bowling

Notes

All lists are referenced to CricketArchive.

See also

 Assam cricket team
 List of Assam first-class cricket records

Cricket in Assam